SNOC (the Sharjah National Oil Corporation) is an Oil and Gas producer based in Sharjah, UAE.  Established by Emiri decree in 2010, SNOC is a corporation wholly owned by the government of the Emirate of Sharjah. SNOC is the operator of the Sajaa Assets located in Sharjah, UAE. The Sajaa Assets consist of four gas fields, a hydrocarbon processing complex and two marine terminals.

History 
On 8 November 1978 a concession agreement was signed between the Emirate of Sharjah and the Amoco production company, allowing Amoco to explore for oil and gas across  of onshore Sharjah.
 
The well marked the discovery of the Sajaa field which turned out to be one largest gas condensate fields in the UAE. In October 1981, the nearby 'Moveyeid' field was discovered. Construction of a gas processing plant at Al Sajaa was completed by June 1982 along with a condensate export terminal and offshore loading facility in Al Hamriyah. In 1983 gas sales started to Sharjah Electricity and Water Authority (SEWA) and later to Dubai and the Northern Emirates.

On 23 March 1984 a construction agreement was signed between SHALCO (Sharjah LPG Company) and JGC to construct an LPG plant to recover secondary condensate plus propane and butane.  An LPG terminal and associated export facilities were also constructed at Hamriyah (the first facility in what would later become Hamriyah port).   The first load of LPG was exported from Hamriyah on 26 April 1986.

Additional exploration drilling discovered a third field ‘Kahaif’ in 1992 with production starting in 1994. A second phase of drilling operations at Sajaa added a further 26 production wells.

In 1999, BP assumed the operating role in Sharjah following a merger with Amoco.

In April 2003, BP Sharjah and Baker Oil Tools began deployment of coiled tubing at the Sajaa field.   The campaign included the world’s first coiled tubing campaign to feature underbalanced casing exit using gas as the milling fluid.  Use of this technology allowed uninterrupted gas production throughout the entire milling operation.

In November 2003, BP Sharjah announced that it had broken the world record for LPG recovery, achieving 99.75% recovery of propane and a near 100 per cent recovery of butane and hydrocarbon condensate at the Sajaa Gas Plant.

In 2010, Sharjah Ruler HH Doctor Sheikh Sultan Bin Mohammed Al Qasimi announced the establishment of the Sharjah National Oil Company "SNOC" according to an Emiri decree. As an interim measure, Petrofac was awarded a five-year duty holder contract by SNOC to operate and maintain the Sajaa Assets and to facilitate a smooth transition following the end of the original Amoco concession agreement. By the end of 2015, SNOC assumed full responsibility for the management and operations of the Sajaa Assets.
 
In January 2011 a field-wide compression project was implemented which included the installation of twelve gas engine driven reciprocating compressors to maximize production at low field pressures.

In 2017, SNOC converted the Moveyeid field into a gas storage facility.  Injection into the Moveyeid field began in December 2017 using centrifugal compressors. In 2020, a second stage of compression was added using reciprocating compressors in series with the original centrifugal machines.  The 2nd stage of compression was commissioned on 6 January 2021 allowing SNOC to increase injection pressures to the Moveyeid field.

In June 2018, SNOC expanded the Sajaa plant with the addition of an LPG road tanker loading facility.

In January 2019, SNOC signed a concession agreement with Eni for the exploration of three onshore areas in Sharjah.

In January 2020, SNOC and Eni announced a new discovery of natural gas and condensate at the Mahani field in Sharjah.  Production from the first well (Mahani-1) started on 4 January 2021, less than a year after the discovery was first announced.

Operations 
SNOC’s operations are all located in the Emirate of Sharjah and include:

 The Sajaa, Kahaif and Mahani onshore gas and condensate fields
 The Moveyeid field, used for gas storage since 2017
 The Sajaa gas, LPG and hydrocarbon-condensate processing complex, which also acts as a hub for gas pipelines connecting the Northern Emirates
 A dedicated facility for LPG road tanker loading attached to the Sajaa processing complex  
 An LPG liquid storage facility, with a marine terminal, located inside the Hamriyah Free Zone
 A hydrocarbon condensate storage terminal at Al Hamriyah with associated offshore loading facilities

See also 

 Abu Dhabi National Oil Company (ADNOC)
 Eni

References 

Government-owned companies of the United Arab Emirates
Oil and gas companies of the United Arab Emirates
UAE
Companies based in the Emirate of Sharjah
Energy companies established in 2010
Non-renewable resource companies established in 2010
Emirati companies established in 2010